Momar Ori (born 25 January 1989) is an Indian cricketer. He made his List A debut for Arunachal Pradesh in the 2018–19 Vijay Hazare Trophy on 19 September 2018.

References

External links
 

1989 births
Living people
Indian cricketers
Arunachal Pradesh cricketers
Place of birth missing (living people)